Xiangyang Subdistrict is a subdistrict in Qinnan District, Qinzhou, Guangxi, China. , it has 2 residential communities under its administration.

See also 
 List of township-level divisions of Guangxi

References 

Township-level divisions of Guangxi
Qinzhou
Subdistricts of the People's Republic of China